Garmeh-ye Shomali Rural District is in Kandovan District of Mianeh County, East Azerbaijan province, Iran. At the National Census of 2006, its population was 7,584 in 1,612 households. There were 6,645 inhabitants in 1,945 households at the following census of 2011. At the most recent census of 2016, the population of the rural district was 5,446 in 1,750 households. The largest of its 32 villages was Armudaq, with 603 people.

References 

Meyaneh County

Rural Districts of East Azerbaijan Province

Populated places in East Azerbaijan Province

Populated places in Meyaneh County